The following sortable table comprises the seven ultra-prominent summits on the islands of the Caribbean Sea.  Each of these peaks has at least  of topographic prominence.  Five of these peaks rise on the island of Hispaniola (three in the Dominican Republic, and two in Haiti) and one each on Jamaica and Cuba.

Topographic elevation is the vertical distance above the reference geoid, a mathematical model of the Earth's sea level as an equipotential gravitational surface.  The topographic prominence of a summit is the elevation difference between that summit and the highest or key col to a higher summit.  The topographic isolation of a summit is the minimum great-circle distance to a point of equal elevation.

This article defines a significant summit as a summit with at least  of topographic prominence, and a major summit as a summit with at least  of topographic prominence.  An ultra-prominent summit is a summit with at least  of topographic prominence.

If an elevation or prominence is calculated as a range of values, the arithmetic mean is shown.

Ultra-prominent summits

Of these seven ultra-prominent summits of the Caribbean, three are located in the Dominican Republic, two in Haiti, and one each in Jamaica and Cuba.

Gallery

See also

List of mountain peaks of North America
List of mountain peaks of Greenland
List of mountain peaks of Canada
List of mountain peaks of the Rocky Mountains
List of mountain peaks of the United States
List of mountain peaks of México
List of mountain peaks of Central America
List of mountain peaks of the Caribbean

List of extreme summits of the Caribbean
Caribbean
Geography of the Caribbean
Geology of the Caribbean
:Category:Mountains of the Caribbean
commons:Category:Mountains of the Caribbean
Physical geography
Topography
Topographic elevation
Topographic prominence
Topographic isolation

Notes

References

External links

Bivouac.com
Peakbagger.com
Peaklist.org
Peakware.com
Summitpost.org

Mountains of the Caribbean
Geography of the Caribbean

Caribbean-related lists
Caribbean, List Of The Ultra-Prominent Summits Of The
Caribbean